"Last to Know" is a song by American recording artist Pink. It was written by her and producer Tim Armstrong for her third studio album Try This (2003). The track was released in some parts of Europe as a single in 2004, peaking just outside the top twenty in the Netherlands and the UK (her first single in the UK not to hit the Top 20). In Austria and Switzerland the single peaked inside the top fifty. In places such as Australia, the song was released to radio and digital download but never had a physical single release.

Critical reception
The Guardian panned the ballad: "The Last to Know spends four minutes howling ferocious obscenities because someone has committed the unpardonable sin of turning down complimentary tickets to a Pink gig."

Music video
The promotional music video for "Last to Know" consists of a montage of shots from some of Pink's concerts during her Try This Tour in Europe. The video, directed by Russell Thomas with footage of the concerts in the Netherlands and London shows Pink performing the song. Other moments from the concert are also shown.

Track listings and formats
UK CD Single
"Last to Know" - 4:30
"Last to Know" (D Bop's Club Edit) - 5:30

European CD Single
"Last to Know"
"God Is a DJ" (Robbie Rivera Main Vocal Mix)
"God Is a DJ" (Robbie Rivera Juicy After Hour Dub)
"God Is a DJ" (Hyper Remix)
"Last to Know" (Music Video)

Charts

Release history

References 

2004 singles
Pink (singer) songs
Songs written by Pink (singer)
Songs written by Tim Armstrong
Rock ballads
2000s ballads
2003 songs
Arista Records singles
Sony BMG singles